South Sudan has never had a national election. However the most recent sub-national election was in 2010 for the presidency of the regional government of Southern Sudan and for the bicameral, 170-member Legislative Assembly.

Voting Age limit is 18 years old and above.

Independence referendum
In 2010, the 2011 South Sudanese independence referendum was held resulting in a strong majority in favour of independence. This was despite difficulties and irregularities.

See also
2023 South Sudanese general election

References